So What is the third studio album by the American singer-songwriter and multi-instrumentalist Joe Walsh. It was released in late 1974 on ABC-Dunhill Records.

It contains hard rock songs such as "Welcome To The Club" and a remake of the Barnstorm track, "Turn To Stone".  It also contains more introspective material such as "Help Me Through the Night" and "Song For Emma".

On a few tracks, Don Henley, Glenn Frey, and Randy Meisner of Eagles contributed backing vocals. Over a year and a half later, Walsh would be drafted into Eagles to replace founding member Bernie Leadon, playing on their best-selling studio album Hotel California.

Production and recording
Two months before the release of the album, Walsh was asked about the album, and he said "I know this album's going to be an important one for me, but it's not easy to just crank them out anymore, I've got, what, six or seven albums out. I don't want the next album to sound like a bunch of outtakes from Smoker. I want it to be the difference between Revolver and Sgt. Pepper. I've held back [the album's release] until that development was there, even though the record company's been screaming for it. I want it to be a big, big step… in thoughts, vocals, playing and maturity."

Don Henley wrote the lyrics for "Falling Down" with Henley providing backing vocals on "Falling Down" and "Time Out". The album features three of the four members of Eagles; Don Henley, Glenn Frey and Randy Meisner providing backing vocals for "Turn to Stone" and "Help Me Through The Night". This would be the first time that the band members would appear on an album with the future Eagle.

"Song for Emma" was written as a memorial for Walsh's almost-three-year-old daughter who had been killed in a car crash on April 1, 1974, four weeks shy of her third birthday. The accident was caused by a drunk driver who hit the Porsche driven by his then-wife Stefany with Emma in the car. Later, Stevie Nicks wrote "Has Anyone Ever Written Anything For You" for Walsh after visiting Emma's grave with him.

Producer Bill Szymczyk had the following written on the run out groove of the vinyl "THAT'S NO BANANY, THATS MY NOZE" on the first pressings of the vinyl.

Critical reception

Writing retrospectively for AllMusic, critic Ben Davies wrote of the album "A number of classic Walsh tracks are featured, including a more polished version of "Turn to Stone," originally featured on his debut album, Barnstorm, in a somewhat more riotous style... Most of the nine tracks feature solos of unquestionable quality in his usual rock style. The classic rock genre that the man so well defined with his earlier albums is present here throughout, and it is pulled off with the usual unparalleled Joe Walsh ability."

Record World said "Time Out" has "the perfect combination of [Walsh's] tasty, extended guitar licks and his vital vocal/lyric capabilities."

Release history

The album was re-issued by MCA Records in 1979 as "Joe Walsh" and minus "All Night Laundry Mat Blues". It appeared in 2011 in Japan in a limited edition miniature replica sleeve in the SHM-CD format. Audio Fidelity released the album on the Super Audio CD format in 2015.

Track listing

Original release

Cassette tape DSC-50171

Personnel

Musicians
Joe Walsh – synthesizer, bass, guitar, piano, vocals, background vocals, Moog synthesizer, mellotron, ARP
Jody Boyer – vocals, background vocals 
Dan Fogelberg – guitar, vocals
Glenn Frey – vocals, background vocals
Guille Garcia – percussion, conga
Bryan Garofalo – bass, vocals, background vocals
Ron Grinel – drums
Don Henley – vocals, background vocals
Russ Kunkel – drums
Randy Meisner – vocals, background vocals
Kenny Passarelli – bass, vocals
J.D. Souther – guitar, vocals, background vocals
Leonard Southwick – harmonica
Tom Stephenson – organ, keyboards
John Stronach – vocals
Joe Vitale – flute, drums, keyboards

Production
Producers: Joe Walsh, John Stronach, Bill Szymczyk
Engineers: Al Blazk, John Stronach, Bill Szymczyk
Mixing: John Stronach, Bill Szymczyk
Mastering: Rick Collins
Design: Jimmy Wachtel
Photography: Joe Walsh, Lorrie Sullivan
Artwork: Jimmy Wachtel

Charts

Certifications
US-Gold

See also
 List of albums released in 1974
 Joe Walsh's discography

References

1974 albums
Joe Walsh albums
Albums produced by Bill Szymczyk
Albums produced by Joe Walsh
Dunhill Records albums
Albums with cover art by Jimmy Wachtel